The industrialization of construction is the process through which construction aims to improve productivity through increased mechanization and automation. The process commonly involves modularization, prefabrication, preassembly, and mass production.

Background
Traditionally, construction has made use of manual labor such as tradesmen and subcontractors for tasks such as the installation of prefabricated elements. In the industrialization phase, construction uses manufacturing processes and technology to perform off-site prefabrication, assembling building components off-site rather than at the point of installation. Pre-assembled components are then sent to the building site in modular units. This type of prefabrication done away from the construction site is often referred to as externalizing work.

The industrialization of construction also implements principles such as the Toyota Production System and agile construction for developing work information systems. These systems and information technology such as the Internet of Things (IoT) create real-time feedback loops for improved decision making.

Scholars name five stages for the industrialization of construction: management of labor, management of work, lean operations, modeling and simulation, and feedback of the source based on the study of industrialization in other industries.

Effects
Productivity in the construction industry has been far behind productivity in general manufacturing, due to the increased industrialization in general manufacturing and construction's continued reliance on field labor. The main aim of industrialized construction is to increase productivity and reduce costs and project time through mechanization. Industrialization makes production processes and methods more efficient and reduces loss of working hours due to adverse weather conditions.

The industrialization of construction can have positive or negative effects on subcontractors and construction workers based on how well they are able to adapt to off-site working opportunities. Increased mechanization may result in a shift from price to performance competition for contractors.

Further reading
Industrialization of the Construction Industry (2013) by Dr. Perry Daneshgari and Dr. Heather Moore With Contribution from Greg Bau.
Winds of Change: Industrialization of Construction (2017) by Dr. Perry Daneshgari and Dr. Heather Moore With Contribution from Phil Nimmo.
Applying Scalable Prefabrication to Industrial Construction Work (2015) by Dr. Perry Daneshgari and Dr. Heather Moore.
The Profitability of Agile Construction (2006) by Dr. Perry Daneshgari and Dr. Heather Moore		
Prefabrication Handbook for the Construction Industry (2019) by Dr. Perry Daneshgari and Dr. Heather Moore						
Agile Construction for the Electrical Contractor, 2nd edition, 2020, Dr. Perry Daneshgari, and Dr. Heather Moore.
Daneshgari, D. P., & Moore, D. H. (2020). INDUSTRIALIZATION: Is Construction Next? CFMA, 43–49.
Daneshgari, D. P., & Moore, D. H. (2020). THE OPERATIONAL MODEL FOR Modular Construction. CFMA.
Daneshgari, D. P., & Moore, D. H. (2020). JOBSITE TO GARAGE: Changing the Mindset of Prefab and Modular Construction. CFMA, 35–43.
Taiichi, O. (1988). Toyota Production System: Beyond Large-scale Production. New York: Productivity Press.
Taiichi., O. (2009). Workplace Management. (J. Miller, Trans.) Makilteo, WA: Gemba Press.
Winds of Change: Industrialization of Construction (2018) by Dr. Perry Daneshgari and Dr. Heather Moore With Contribution from Phil Nimmo.
Taylor, F. (1911). The Principles of Scientific Management. Harper & Brothers.
Shewhart, W. A. (1923). Economic Control of Quality of Manufactured Product. ASQ Quality Press.
Shingo, S. (1987). Non-Stock Production the Shingo System of Continuous Improvement. Productivity Press.
Shingo, S. (1989). A Study of the Toyota Production System. Productivity Press.
Sloan, A. P. (1972). My Years with General Motors. Doubleday.

References

Industrialisation
History of construction
Economic history